Chris Gale (born 1983) is an English male lawn and indoor bowler.

Bowls career
He is an England international  and was the National junior singles runner-up in 2002 and pairs runner-up in 2000 during the Men's National Championships.

He was world ranked 26 in 2017 and bowls outdoors for Manchester Heaton Hall and indoors for Blackpool Newton Hall.
 
He won the National Championship triples in 2018 and was part of the fours team who finished runner-up.

References

1983 births
Living people
English male bowls players